is a neighbourhood located in Akita City, Akita Prefecture, Japan. Annexed by the city in 1941, it borders the neighborhoods of Shimokitate on the east, Yanagida on the north, Tegata on the west and Sakura and Yokomori on the south that is bounded by Taihei River. Developed primarily in the post-World War II era, it is residential with commercial uses fronting prefectural roads #41, #28 and #62. The neighborhood is the location of the Akita University Hospital and Hiroomote Shopping Center.

Households and population 

As of 1 October 2016, there were 14,095  people residing in this neighborhood, which contained 7,160 housing units.

Schools

Hiroomote Elementary School

Hiroomote Elementary School  is a coeducational primary school located in Hiroomote, Akita City in Akita Prefecture, Japan, teaching children of aged 6 to 12 years. The school starts in April and ends in March, and the nickname is Hirosho. It was founded in 1874, and the school had its 140th anniversary celebration in 2015. The neighbouring places include an area of native forest named "Woods of Green Boy" as a part of Tegatayama. It is governed by the City of Akita Board of Education, and the staff is composed of a principal, an associate principal, classroom teachers and an administration team of staff, totally 42 persons. The principal from 2018 to 2020 was Kazuki Hoshino. The current principal is Tomoko Owada.

History
The school was formed in a private house of Yanaisado, Hiroomote Village, Minamiakita District, Akita, on 3 November 1874 (Meiji 7). The former school building was located in Tsurubemachi, a current E-pal site.
The school moved to its current location in 1977 and a new swimming pool was opened in 1980. The Hiroomote baseball club won prefectural titles several times under the reign of manager Tatsuro Tsuruta(鶴田達郎) in late 70's and 80's. The team was also coached by former Nipponham Fighters pitcher, Mikio Kudo. They have got 2-time prefectural gold medal at NHK School Choir Competition in 2007 and 2011, and 2-time prefectural champion of "30 persons 31 legs" race in 2000  and 2001. They also have in-hospital classrooms called “Himawari class (elementary school students)” at Akita University Hospital. Hiroomote Jidokan (広面児童館, children's center) is attached and it occasionally turned out to be a polling station placing ballot boxes.

Students, logo, uniform and school lunches
As of 2019, the school has a roll of 550 students. The Hiroomote ES logo consists of "hiro" letter in kanji and three unhulled rice, which represents Virtue, Wisdom and Body. It does not have a compulsory uniform that must be worn daily except for gym clothes. Kyushoku (School meals) are prepared in the school kitchen, and provided in Hiroomote ES.

Curriculum

Core subjects include
Japanese
Arithmetic
Science 
Social studies 
Music
Crafts
Physical education
Home economics
English
Source:

Sports day
They have a "Hirosho Dai Undokai", Sports Day event in May, and the school is divided into red, white and blue teams, which compete in footraces, obstacle races, tamaire (a kind of basketball), and relay races. All grades participate in the half-day festivities, families join in to watch, to set up the tents, to cheer their children.

School shows and productions
Hiroomote ES host a school play entitled "Gakushu Happyokai" every year at Hirosho Arena. This performing arts show had been called "Gakugeikai".

School trips and camps
11-year-old students usually have a stay & camp at Mantarame() of Taiheizan Resort Park located in the skirt of Mt. Taihei. This lodging training had been done at Omoriyama Boys' House() until 2002.
12-year-old pupils have their largest school trip to Sendai area.

No janitors
Japanese primary schools do not employ janitors, and student have to clean it up themselves.

Gallery

Notable alumni
Yukio Endo　 - olympic gymnastics gold medalist
Hiroyuki Enoki - Oriental and Pacific Boxing Federation Featherweight Champion boxer
Ayako Ito - announcer　She also played basketball.
Yuka Komatsu - alpinist
Kazue Sannomaru - announcer

Principals

source:

Surroundings

Kudo Sports - School's official gym clothes available
Central Sports - co-founded by alumni Yukio Endo
Taiheizan Miyoshi Shrine
Akita University Hospital
Tegatayama Bridge
DCM Homac
Super Drug Asahi
Tsutaya Bookstore
Maxvalu Tohoku
Yellow Hat
Sano Pharmacy
Tsuruha Drug
Itoku Supermarket

Joto Junior High School

, referred to as "Joto" by most, is a public school in Japan. It teaches teenagers between seventh and ninth grades. Akita's Joto claimed its maiden title at Japan’s National Junior High School Baseball Championship at Yokohama Stadium in 1982.

Notable alumni
Tadayoshi "Jumbo" Kawabe - professional baseball pitcher
Shiho Hara - announcer

Shrines and temples
Taiheizan Miyoshi Shrine
Isurugi Shrine
Honnenji

Public services
E-Pal
Joto Koban The second largest kōban in Tohoku 
Joto Fire Station Hiroomote Branch

Post offices
Hiroomote Post Office
Yashikiden Post Office
Myoden Post Office

Gallery

References

Akita (city)
Geography of Akita Prefecture
Neighbourhoods in Japan